The fifth Asian Championships in Athletics were held in November 1983 in Kuwait City, Kuwait.

Medal summary

Men's events

Women's events

Medal table

See also
1983 in athletics (track and field)

References
GBR Athletics

Asian Athletics Championships
Asian
Asian Championships in Athletics
Asian Championships in Athletics
International sports competitions hosted by Kuwait
Athletics in Kuwait